Harry Eugene Larche (July 12, 1923 – May 31, 2005) was an American football player and coach.  He served as the head coach at the University of Toledo from 1957 to 1959 and at Graceland University in three separate stints spanning 1960 to 1973.

A star player at Arkansas State University, Larche was drafted into the All-America Football Conference. and also the Green Bay Packers of the National Football League in 1949, though he never played a game for the Packers.

As a head coach at Graceland, he owned the distinction of letting a woman play in a game.

Head coaching record

References

External links
 

1923 births
2005 deaths
People from Jackson Parish, Louisiana
Players of American football from Louisiana
American football tackles
Arkansas State Red Wolves football players
Coaches of American football from Louisiana
Arkansas State Red Wolves football coaches
Toledo Rockets football coaches
Graceland Yellowjackets football coaches